Saint-Luc or Saint Luke may refer to:

People
 Saint Luke or Luke the Evangelist,  one of the Four Evangelists. The Early Church Fathers ascribed to him authorship of both the Gospel of Luke and the Acts of the Apostles. Patron saint of artists, physicians, bachelors, surgeons, students and butchers; his feast day is 18 October

Places
 Saint-Luc, Quebec, Canada, a former town, now part of Saint-Jean-sur-Richelieu
 Côte Saint-Luc, a city on the island of Montreal in Quebec, Canada
 Saint Luke Parish, Dominica, an administrative parish
 Saint-Luc, Eure, France, a village
 Saint-Luc, Switzerland, a municipality

Others
 AS Saint-Luc, a football team in the Democratic Republic of Congo
 Cliniques Universitaires Saint-Luc, a hospital in Brussels, Belgium
 Institut Saint-Luc, a Belgian art school

See also
 Guild of Saint Luke, the painters' and artists' guild in Medieval Europe
 Saint-Luc-de-Bellechasse, Quebec, a municipality
 Saint-Luc-de-Vincennes, Quebec, a municipality
 Saint Lucas (disambiguation)
 St. Luke's (disambiguation)
 San Luca, an Italian village
 San Lucas (disambiguation)
 Luc (disambiguation)